The fourth United Andhra Pradesh Legislative Assembly elections were held in 1967. Out of a total of 1,067 candidates, 276 men and eleven women were elected. The Indian National Congress won 165 seats, the Swatantra Party (SWA) won twenty-nine seats and the Independent Party won sixty-eight seats.

Of the 287 seats contested, 236 were general, eleven were for scheduled tribes and forty were for scheduled castes.

Results

Elected members

References

Andhra Pradesh
1962
1960s in Andhra Pradesh
State Assembly elections in Andhra Pradesh